In military terms, 96th Division or 96th Infantry Division may refer to:

 Infantry divisions 
 96th Infantry Division (German Empire)
 96th Infantry Division (Wehrmacht)
 96th Division (Imperial Japanese Army)
 96th Infantry Division (United States)

 Aviation divisions 
 96th Air Division